Appleford is an English surname. Notable people with this name include:

 Alexander Appleford, RAF pilot
 Alice Appleford, Australian nurse
 Geoff Appleford, South African rugby union player
 Henry of Appleford, English monk
 Patrick Appleford, English Anglican priest and hymnwriter

See also 
 

English-language surnames
English toponymic surnames